Edward Glen (sometimes credited as Eddie Glen) is a Canadian actor, who has appeared in and provided voices in films, television shows and video games. He is best known for voicing Thomas the Tank Engine in the 2000 film Thomas and the Magic Railroad. Since 1998, he has been the voiceover of YTV.

Career
Glen began his acting career in 1986 in various theatre productions in Canada and in the United Kingdom, where he still continues to act in theatre to this day. 

Outside of acting in theatre, he also works extensively as a voice actor in various anime and animated television shows and films, such as Odin: Photon Sailer Starlight, Dangaioh, Hyper Combat Unit Dangaioh, Gunnm, Patlabor: The Movie and its sequel, Blazing Dragons, Flying Rhino Junior High, 'Undergrads, Angela Anaconda, Rescue Heroes, Rescue Heroes: The Movie and RoboRoach.

In 2000, Glen became the voice of Thomas the Tank Engine in Britt Allcroft's fantasy film Thomas and the Magic Railroad, replacing John Bellis in the final cut of the film. The film received mostly negative reviews from critics and was a box office failure.

Glen has also made live action appearances in several television shows and television films, such as Twice in a Lifetime, Daydream Believers: The Monkees' Story, Earth: Final Conflict, Street Time, Skatoony, and The Frim.

Filmography
Film

Television

Video games

TheatreLil Red Robin Hood - MarvinGrease - Teen Angel, Vince FontaineThe Wizard of Oz - Randy, WizardJukebox Hero: The Musical - Harvey, Hal, EdA Christmas Carol - Bob CratchitOne for the Pot - Hickory WoodMarathon of Hope: The Musical - Bill VigorsIt Runs in the Family - Dr. Hubert BonneyDarling of the Day - BertPeter Pan: The Panto - SmeeThe Pirates of Penzance - Seargent of PoliceSpamalot - Sir RobinCinderella - Buttons, WayneLes Miserables - ThenardierMan of La Mancha - SanchoWakowski Brothers - ConardThe Little Mermaid - SpongeBob Triangle PantsSnow White - Fool, Court JesterBloodless - William HareThe 39 Steps - ClownBeauty and the Beast - Burt, SporkGuys and Dolls - Nathan DetroitThe Rocky Horror Show - Dr. Scott, EddieMyths and Hymns - EnsembleThe Music Man - Marcellus WashburnMoby Dick - FlaskA Few Good Men - Sam WeinbergEvangeline - EnsembleDads - JoeyAladdin - BeansMan of La Mancha - Sancho PanzaTriple Espresso -Little Me - NobleYou're a Good Man Charlie Brown - Charlie BrownI Love you, You're Perfect, Now Change - LeadA Bedroll of Foreigners - HeinzThe Amazing Mr. Blunden - JamieForever Plaid - SparkyLittle Shop of Horrors - SeymourThe Bends - 3 HandlerKidnapped - Ransom, DavidJacob Two Two'' - Noah, Fearless

References

External links
 
 

Canadian male television actors
Canadian male voice actors
Living people
Canadian male musical theatre actors
Year of birth missing (living people)